The Yamaha YTR-2320 Trumpet was a student level B-flat trumpet, manufactured by Yamaha from 1984 until 1997. It was replaced with the YTR-2335 and then the YTR-2330. It was lightweight, made with yellow brass.

References

External links
 http://www.yamaha.com/yamahavgn/CDA/ContentDetail/ModelSeriesDetail.html?CNTID=24432&CTID=241200&LGFL=&HST=Y

Yamaha music products